Madhav Narayan (Nepali: माधव नारायण) is a municipality in Rautahat District, a part of Province No. 2 in Nepal. It was formed in 2016 occupying current 9 sections (wards) from previous 9 former VDCs.

References 

Populated places in Rautahat District
Nepal municipalities established in 2017
Municipalities in Madhesh Province